Leaving is a British television sitcom which aired on BBC Two in two series from 1984 to 1985.

Main cast
 Keith Barron as Daniel Ford
 Susan Hampshire as  Martha Ford
 Gary Cady as Matthew Ford
 Caroline Dennis as Josephine
 Lucy Aston as  Gina Ford
 Elizabeth Bradley as  Mrs. Ford
 Richard Vernon as  Mr. Chessington
 Philip Latham as Mr. Raphael
 Norma Streader as Freda
 Myrtle Devenish as Mrs. Barry
 Rachel Davies as Jan
 John Arthur as Ray Huntingdon
 Christine Shaw as Delia

References

Bibliography
 Horace Newcomb. Encyclopedia of Television. Routledge, 2014.

External links
 

1984 British television series debuts
1985 British television series endings
1980s British comedy television series
BBC television sitcoms
English-language television shows